Charles Isaac Hubbard,  (October 29, 1940 – February 12, 2020) was a Canadian politician.

Hubbard was a member of the Liberal Party of Canada. He was a former member of the House of Commons of Canada, representing the riding of Miramichi, New Brunswick from 1993 to 2008. Hubbard was a former school principal. He was a former Parliamentary Secretary to the Minister of Indian Affairs and Northern Development and Parliamentary Secretary to the Minister of Transport during the government of Paul Martin.

Hubbard was born in Newcastle, New Brunswick. In 1961, he graduated from the Royal Canadian School of Infantry and served briefly with Canadian Guards in Germany and later as a platoon officer, quartermaster, adjutant, company commander and Deputy commander of 2 Royal New Brunswick Regiment (NS).

In 1963, he began his career at Harkins High School in Newcastle and also taught at North and South Esk Regional High School in Sunny Corner, New Brunswick. He was the first principal of Miramichi Valley High School. He was also a member of the New Brunswick Teachers Association, the Principals Council, and the National Association of Secondary School Principals.

Active in his church  and community, he was deeply involved in many community organizations. This included some 17 years as a Director and President of Northumberland Cooperative Dairy Ltd.

Hubbard had a Bachelor of Arts degree majoring in History and Economics, and continued with a Master of Arts in History and a Bachelor of Education degree.

Hubbard lived with his wife Patricia on the family farm in Red Bank, New Brunswick.

He died on February 12, 2020.

References

External links

1940 births
2020 deaths
Members of the House of Commons of Canada from New Brunswick
Canadian Presbyterians
Liberal Party of Canada MPs
Members of the King's Privy Council for Canada
People from Miramichi, New Brunswick
21st-century Canadian politicians